Troitsk is a rural locality (a selo), the only inhabited locality, and the administrative center of Troitsky Rural Okrug of Olyokminsky District in the Sakha Republic, Russia, located  from Olyokminsk, the administrative center of the district. Its population as of the 2010 Census was 353, of whom 187 were male and 166 female, down from 388 as recorded during the 2002 Census.

References

Notes

Sources
Official website of the Sakha Republic. Registry of the Administrative-Territorial Divisions of the Sakha Republic. Olyokminsky District. 

Rural localities in Olyokminsky District